Catalog or catalogue may refer to:

Cataloging
in science and technology
Library catalog, a catalog of books and other media
Union catalog, a combined library catalog describing the collections of a number of libraries
 Calendar (archive) and Finding aid, catalogs of an archive
Astronomical catalog, a catalog of astronomical objects
Star catalog, a catalog of stars
Pharmacopoeia, a book containing directions for the preparation of compound medicines
Database catalog, in computer science 
in arts
Collection catalog, a catalog of a museum
Exhibition catalogue, a catalogue of art
Catalogue raisonné, a list of artworks
Music catalog, a catalog of musical compositions
Font catalog, a catalog of typefaces containing specimen with example use of fonts
in sales
Mail order catalog
Parts book, a book published by a manufacturer, containing the part numbers of their products
Trade literature, printed materials published by manufacturing, wholesaling, or retailing firms
The retail product offerings of an online shopping service
 in other uses
Auction catalog, a catalog that lists items to be sold at an auction
Stamp catalog, a catalog of postage stamps
as a proper name
Catalogue (John Hartford album), 1981
Catalogue (Moloko album), 2006
Catalog (album), an album by Amano Tsukiko
Catalogue 1987–1995,  1995 album by Buck-Tick
Catalogue 2005,  2005 album by Buck-Tick
The Catalogue, 2009 box set by Kraftwerk
3-D The Catalogue, 2017 album by Kraftwerk

See also
Catalog album (disambiguation)
Catalogue aria, a genre of aria, particularly in Italian-language comic operas
Categorization
Compendium
Registry (disambiguation)
Systematic name
Taxonomy (biology)